The "Dark Horse" Tour was a worldwide concert tour by Canadian rock band Nickelback. It was their first world tour since the conclusion of their massive All the Right Reasons Tour, ending on September 2, 2007, in Kansas City, Missouri. The tour was in support of their new album Dark Horse (2008). Dates were announced on November 26, 2008. Seether and Saving Abel were the opening acts on the tour. On the second half of the North American tour, Hinder, Papa Roach, and Saving Abel were in support. Black Stone Cherry were the support act for the European tour of the UK in May 2009.

During the tour, Ryan Peake sang for a cover of "Use Somebody" by Kings of Leon during an encore. During the UK leg of the tour, they sang a cover of "Highway to Hell" by AC/DC with Chris Robertson of Black Stone Cherry on vocals, just before the T-shirt cannons. A similar format was applied during the rest of the tour, however they sang a cover of "Hey Man, Nice Shot" by Filter with Shaun Morgan of Seether on vocals. In some of the early shows, "This Afternoon" was played instead of "If Today Was Your Last Day". During the summer leg of the tour the band sang "Highway to Hell" with Austin John Winkler of Hinder and Jacoby Shaddix of Papa Roach. On some stops they played "Friends In Low Places" by Garth Brooks and "Tequila Makes Her Clothes Fall Off" by Joe Nichols acoustically. The rock band Sick Puppies supported Nickelback in Australia. On the 2010 European leg of the tour, it was confirmed that Daughtry would support Nickelback on all of the Europe dates. They also announced more dates for the spring of 2010 that takes place in select venues in Canada and the United States. Breaking Benjamin, Shinedown, and Sick Puppies have been confirmed to be the opening. They also announced a tour that would take place in the Fall of 2010 with Three Days Grace and Buckcherry as supporting acts.

According to Billboard magazine, Nickelback played in front of 1,046,973 people on the 2009 North American section of the tour. In the same section, Nickelback grossed $49,908,542 from the tour. Overall, worldwide the band grossed $57.8 million from the 2009 section of the tour. In the 2010 North American section of the tour the band grossed $35,035,196, and they played in front of 497,072 people. Overall, worldwide the 2010 section of the tour grossed $44.5 million. By July 2010, a total of more than 1.6 million tickets had been sold.

Tour dates

Box office score data

Personnel
Chad Kroeger – lead vocals, guitar
Ryan Peake – guitar, backing vocals
Mike Kroeger – bass
Daniel Adair – drums, backing vocals

References

External links

 Dark Horse Tour official website
 Nickelback official website

2009 concert tours
2010 concert tours
Nickelback concert tours